The 1995 FIFA World Youth Championship, known as the 1995 FIFA/Coca-Cola World Youth Championship for sponsorship purposes, was the 10th edition of the FIFA World Youth Championship. It was held in Qatar from 13 to 28 April 1995. The tournament took place in three venues within the city of Doha. The tournament was originally going to be held in Nigeria. Due to a meningitis outbreak, however, Nigeria withdrew from hosting duties and FIFA relocated the event to Qatar.

Qualification

1.Teams that made their debut.

Squads
For a list of the squads see 1995 FIFA World Youth Championship squads

Group stages

Group A

Group B

Group C

Group D

Knockout stages

Quarter-finals

Semi-finals

Third place play-off

Final

Result

Awards

Goalscorers
Joseba Etxeberria of Spain won the Golden Shoe award for scoring seven goals. In total, 105 goals were scored by 58 different players, with only one of them credited as own goal.

7 goals
 Joseba Etxeberria
5 goals
 Caio
4 goals

 Mark Viduka
 Sebastián Rozental
 Dani
 Nuno Gomes

3 goals

 Sebastián Pena
 Reinaldo
 Mendel Witzenhausen
 Agostinho
 Raúl

2 goals

 Francisco Gabriel Guerrero
 Leonardo Biagini
 Walter Coyette
 Élder
 Basile Essa
 Macdonald Ndiefi
 Valery Ntamag
 Jewison Bennette
 Amado Guevara
 Hidetoshi Nakata
 Nordin Wooter
 Iván de la Peña
 Míchel Salgado
 Raúl Ochoa
 Roger

1 goal

 Andrés Garrone
 Ariel Ibagaza
 Raúl Chaparro
 Robert Enes
 Murilo
 Blaise Butunungu
 Fredy Ndayishimite
 Augustine Simo
 Dante Poli
 Frank Lobos
 Jafet Soto
 Carsten Hinz
 Jan Walle
 Marcel Rath
 Edwin Medina
 Luis Oseguera
 Orvin Cabrera
 Daisuke Oku
 Nobuhisa Yamada
 Sotaro Yasunaga
 Susumu Oki
 Rob Gehring
 Wilfred Bouma
 Beto
 Mohammed Salem Al-Enazi
 Aleksandr Lipko
 Sergei Lysenko
 Sergei Semak
 Yevgeni Chumachenko
 Luis Martínez
 Nihad Al Boushi

Own goal
 Carlos Felipe (playing against Australia)

Final ranking

Notes

External links
FIFA World Youth Championship Qatar 1995 , FIFA.com
RSSSF > FIFA World Youth Championship > 1995
FIFA Technical Report (Part 1), (Part 2) and (Part 3)

FIFA World Youth Championship
FIFA World Championship
FIFA World Youth Championship, 1995
FIFA World Youth Championship
FIFA World Youth Championship